Sir James Paterson Ross, 1st Baronet,  (26 May 1895 – 5 July 1980) was a British general surgeon, who was surgeon to King George VI and, from 1952, Surgeon to the Queen.

Ross' son, Sir (James) Keith Ross, 2nd Baronet (1927–2003), was also a surgeon.

References 

1895 births
1980 deaths
British surgeons
Knights Commander of the Royal Victorian Order
Fellows of the Royal College of Surgeons
Baronets in the Baronetage of the United Kingdom
20th-century surgeons